The following is a list of LSU Tigers men's basketball head coaches. There have been 23 head coaches of the Tigers in their 115-season history.

LSU's current head coach is Matt McMahon. He was hired as the Tigers' head coach in March 2022, replacing Will Wade, who was fired before the 2022 NCAA tournament.

References

LSU

LSU Tigers basketball, men's, coaches